Washington Lake is a lake in Sibley County, in the U.S. state of Minnesota. The first pioneers to settle at the lake being natives of Washington, D.C., caused the name to be selected.

See also
List of lakes in Minnesota

References

Lakes of Minnesota
Lakes of Sibley County, Minnesota